Semiostrovskiy Reid is a strait, located at , separating the islands Sem Ostrovov and the Kola Peninsula, Russia.

Sources 
 Map of strait

Straits of Russia
Straits of the Arctic Ocean
Bodies of water of Murmansk Oblast